Mustapha Baba Shehuri  (born 4 July 1961) is a Nigerian politician who is the incumbent Federal Minister of State for Agriculture and Rural Hon Development. He attended the government secondary school in Damagun, Borno from 1978 to 1983, and Gamboru Primary School in Maiduguri from 1972 to 1978. He graduated from the University of Maiduguri in 2002, with an advanced diploma in public administration. In 2007, he received a Bachelor of Science in sociology and anthropology from the same institution. Under the previous non-party electoral system, Honourable Shehuri served as a councillor for the Maiduguri Metropolitan's Lamisula/Jabbamari Ward from 1966 to 1997.

Shehuri served in the Borno State House of Assembly from 1999 until 2008, and in the Nigerian House of Representatives from 2003 until 2010.

References

Living people
Nigerian politicians
1961 births